Harvard High School, also known as HHS, is a 4-year public high school located in Harvard, Illinois, about 4 miles south of Wisconsin and 80 miles northwest of Chicago. It is part of the Harvard Community Unit School District 50, along with Richard D. Crosby Elementary School (K-3), Jefferson Elementary School (4-5), Washington Elementary School (PreK), and Harvard Jr. High School (6-8).

History 
The school opened in 1921, and has undergone many renovations since then. Its most recent renovation was in 2014, adding a new wing to the second floor and remodeling the cafeteria.

Athletics 
Harvard High School is part of the Kishwaukee River Conference. Its mascot is the Hornet, and it offers the following sports:

 Football
Cross Country
Soccer
 Cheerleading
 Girls' volleyball
 Golf
 Wrestling
 Basketball
 Softball
 Baseball
 Track and field

References

Harvard, Illinois
Schools in McHenry County, Illinois